Solanum bullatum is a species of plant in the family Solanaceae. It is endemic to southeastern Brazil, in Atlantic Forest habitats. It is found in the states of Bahia, Minas Gerais, Paraná, Rio de Janeiro, Santa Catarina, and São Paulo.

References

bullatum
Endemic flora of Brazil
Flora of the Atlantic Forest
Flora of Bahia
Flora of Minas Gerais
Flora of Paraná (state)
Flora of Rio de Janeiro (state)
Flora of Santa Catarina (state)
Flora of São Paulo (state)
Conservation dependent plants
Vulnerable flora of South America
Taxonomy articles created by Polbot